A sink is a bowl-shaped fixture used for washing hands or small objects.

Sink may also refer to:

Music
Sink (Floater album), an album released by rock band Floater in September 1994.
Sink (Foetus album), an album released by solo musical project Foetus Inc in October 1989.
Sink, a late 80s/early 90s UK punk band led by Ed Wenn after leaving The Stupids.

People
 Alex Sink (born 1948), Adelaide "Alex" Sink, Chief Financial Officer of the state of Florida
 Mark Sink, (born 1958), American photographer
 Robert Sink (1905–1965), senior United States Army officer
 Sadie Sink (born 2002), American actress
 Sink Izumi, the lead character in the anime series Dog Days

Science
 Sink (biology), a target tissue of (photosynthetic) metabolites; see Phloem loading
 Sink (computing), an object implementing the interface to receive incoming events
 Sink (geography), an area of dry land below sea-level
 Sink (graph theory), a vertex with 0 out-degree
 Sink, a point where the divergence of a vector field is negative
 Sink, a flow network node that has more incoming flow than the outgoing flow
 Sink condition (pharmaceutics), a required condition during chemical dissolution tests
 Sink, or attractor, in dynamical systems (mathematics)
 Sinkhole, a natural depression or hole caused by chemical dissolution of carbonate rocks
 Current sink, in current sources and sinks
 Heat sink, a component or assembly that transfers heat generated within a solid material to a fluid medium

Other uses
Sink (champagne), the act of pouring out the champagne in the sink
Sink, West Virginia, a community in the United States
Sink OFC, a term for an offshore financial center

See also
Sinking (disambiguation)
Sinks Canyon State Park, a Wyoming state park located in the Wind River Mountains
Carbon dioxide sink
Synch (disambiguation)
Lincoln Burrows or Linc the Sink, a character in Prison Break